Guy–Concordia station is a Montreal Metro station in the borough of Ville-Marie in Montreal, Quebec, Canada. It is operated by the Société de transport de Montréal (STM) and serves the Green Line. The station opened on October 14, 1966, as part of the original network of the Metro. It has consistently been one of the network's busiest stations, ranking 5th from 2000 to 2001, 4th from 2002 to 2007, 3rd since 2008, and 2nd since 2021.

Overview 
Before the station underwent renovations, the walls on the platform were covered in an orange-brown glazed tile pattern that still covers some of the walls in the access areas. These tile were replaced with a more modern style glazed ceramic white tiles, multicolored tile mosaics over the seats, and white stone floors. 

Designed by J.A. Chicoine, it is a normal side platform station, built in tunnel with a transept, ticket hall, and access at each end. The platforms at Guy-Concordia are notably longer than the trains, and so a small section at each end of each platform is closed off by a gate for safety.

The eastern access contains shops and services, and an underground city connection to five Concordia University buildings: EV, MB, GM, LB and H buildings.

There are several shops and services on the mezzanine (where the ticket booth and the turnstiles are located) of the Guy-exit side of the station, including a Tim Hortons, a Chinese restaurant (Monsieur Gao), a "Belle Pizza", an Asian pastry shop (Cocobun), a hair salon, a cyber cafe, shoe store and another small cafe. The station platforms feature the MétroVision information screens which displays news, commercials, and the amount of time left until the next train arrives. This was the third station after Berri-UQAM and McGill to have the screens installed.

Historical facts
Guy–Concordia was the first Metro station in Montreal to be designed by the city's architects in the early 1960s. Therefore, during its design phase it was used to determine many of the architectural standards that were used for the other stations of the initial Metro system.

As the building above the Guy entrance was constructed at the same time as the underlying Metro station, Guy-Concordia also became the first station to have several storeys of commercial spaces above it.

Guy–Concordia (or just Guy at the time) was part of the initial network that was officially opened on October 14, 1966. It was the second east-bound station on the Green Line (Atwater was the terminal station between the opening in 1966 and opening of the extension of the eastern part of the Green Line until the Angrignon terminal station on September 3, 1978).

Origin of the name

The station was originally called Guy after the street where it is located: Guy Street, which, in turn, takes its name from Étienne Guy who represented Montreal in the Legislative Assembly of Lower Canada and was the owned of the land through which the street runs.

On January 1, 1988, it was renamed Guy–Concordia to reflect the fact that it serves the Sir George Williams campus of Concordia University.

(Note that in French the name Guy is pronounced to rhyme with bee, whereas in English the name is usually pronounced to rhyme with high. The station is still sometimes referred to simply as Guy.)

Underground Connections 

As of April 7, 2010, all of Concordia University's main buildings are connected through a system of underground passages leading to the Guy–Concordia station. A new tunnel was added to the already-existing tunnel that connects the Hall building with the LB building and leads to the station, exiting near the Uniprix store located near the turnstiles.

The new JMSB building, which opened to students in September 2009 features a tunnel stretching under Guy street that connects it with the EV building, opposite the location of the Le Gym. This major tunnel is 396 feet long and lined with ceramic tiles, with display panels for added visual interest.

Renovations 

In March 2012, the St-Mathieu exit of the station underwent renovation work that included new flooring, ceilings, walls, lighting, as well as sprinkler and electrical systems. The escalators also underwent an overhaul and motorized doors were added to the station's entrance and exit. This work represents the second major renovations performed to the station since its construction in 1966.

When work at the St-Mathieu Street exit was complete in August 2012, similar renovations commenced at the Guy Street entrance. This work included new flooring, ceilings, walls, as well as adding four turnstiles for increased traffic.

Connecting bus routes

Nearby points of interest

Exits
 Guy Exit, 1445 Guy Street
 St-Mathieu Exit, 1801 de Maisonneuve Boulevard West

Connected via the underground city
 Concordia University Engineering and Visual Arts (EV) Building
 Concordia University Guy Metro Annex (GM) Building
 Concordia University John Molson School of Business (MB) Building
 Concordia University Henry F. Hall Building (H) (social sciences and humanities)
 Concordia University John Wilson McConnell Library Building(LB)

Other
 Concordia University, Sir George Williams Campus
 Quartier Concordia
 Canadian Centre for Architecture
 Éco-quartier Peter-McGill
 Faubourg Sainte-Catherine
 Collège de Montréal
 Golden Square Mile
 Montreal Museum of Fine Arts
 Norman Bethune Square
 Musée Marguerite d'Youville
 Montreal Masonic Memorial Temple
 Grand séminaire de Montréal
 Montreal General Hospital
 Cuban Consulate-General
 The Sacred Heart School of Montreal
 Trafalgar School for Girls

References

External links

 Guy-Concordia Station - official site
 Montreal by Metro, metrodemontreal.com - photos, information, and trivia
 2011 STM System Map
 2011 Downtown System Map
 Metro Map

Green Line (Montreal Metro)
Downtown Montreal
Railway stations in Canada opened in 1966
1966 establishments in Quebec
Railway stations in Canada at university and college campuses